Pallikonda Perumal Temple is a Hindu dedicated to the deity Vishnu, located at Malayadippatti in Kulatthur taluk of Pudukkottai district in Tamil Nadu, India.

Location
This cave temple is located at a distance of 33 km from Pudukottai, in Killukkottai.

Cave temples
In Malayadippatti, two cave temples are found. While one is devoted for Shiva another is devoted for Vishnu. This is a twin temple. Shiva temple is known as Vahisvaramudayar Temple and Vishnu temple is known as Pallikonda Perumal Temple.This temple meant for Vishnu is known as Kan Thirantha Perumal Temple.

Presiding deity
The deity, in reclining posture, is known as Pallikonda Perumal. The Goddesses are Sridevi and Boodevi.

Specialities
In the west part of the Shiva cave, Vishnu cave is found. In this cave temple, Pallikonda Perumal is found, sculpted in the cave itself. From the inscriptions it is learnt that this temple belonged to 7-8th century CE. The presiding deity is found like the presiding deity found in Thirumayam cave temple.

Puja
Pujas are held four times daily at Kalasanthi (7.00 a.m.), Uttchikkalam (noon 12.00), Sayaratchai (6.00 p.m.) and arthajamam (8.30 p.m.).The temple is opened for worship from 6.00 to 12.00 noon and 5.00 to 8.00 p.m.

Gallery

References

External links
விக்கிமேப்பியாவில் மலையடிப்பட்டி பள்ளிகொண்டபெருமாள் கோயில் அமைவிடம்

Hindu temples in Pudukkottai district
Vishnu temples